The Central District of Ramian County is a district (bakhsh) in Ramian County, Golestan Province, Iran. At the 2006 census, its population was 47,540, in 11,373 families.  The District has three cities: Ramian, Sangdevin and Daland. The District has two rural districts (dehestan): Daland Rural District and Qaleh Miran Rural District.

References 

Districts of Golestan Province
Ramian County